Neogerris hesione is a species of water strider in the family Gerridae. It is found in the Caribbean, Central America, and North America.

References

External links

 

Insects described in 1902
Gerrini